The American College of Financial Services (The American College) is a private online university focused on professional training for financial practitioners and located in King of Prussia, Pennsylvania. It offers several professional certifications and master's degrees. Annually, The American College educates approximately 40,000 students, mainly through distance education.

The institution was founded as The American College of Life Underwriters in 1927 by Solomon S. Huebner of the Wharton School at the University of Pennsylvania. Huebner was a professional involved in the development of economic theory. His theory of human life value is used in the field of insurance. It was his vision for a college-level professional education program for insurance agents that led to the creation of The American College.

Today the college offers professional training to all types of financial practitioners. When the institution began, programs focused exclusively on providing education to life insurance professionals.  The Chartered Life Underwriter (CLU) designation was the first credential offered by The College. Today The College provides training for the Certified Financial Planner (CFP) exam, The Chartered Financial Consultant (ChFC) designation, and the Master of Science in Financial Services (MSFS) master's degree.

Twenty full-time faculty members and financial experts work at the campus.

The American College campus was bought by the Jack M. Barrack Hebrew Academy in 2007.

In May 2019, The American College moved its operational headquarters to King of Prussia, Pennsylvania.

Notable alumni
Alfred W. Redmer, Jr., Maryland politician.
Lynn Yeakel, Pennsylvania administrator and politician

References

External links
Official website

 
Educational institutions established in 1927
Universities and colleges in Montgomery County, Pennsylvania
1927 establishments in Pennsylvania
Private universities and colleges in Pennsylvania